Fresh Water is the debut album by Australian rock and blues singer Alison McCallum, released in 1972. Rare for an Australian artist at the time, it came in a gatefold sleeve. It was re-issued in 1974 under the title Any Way You Want Me in a single sleeve with new artwork.

Track listing
 Fresh Water (Simon Napier-Bell) – 3:25
 Ain't Eatin' Dinner Tonight (Simon Napier-Bell) – 3:15
 Any Way You Want Me (Chip Taylor) – 2:32
 Lean Woman Blues (Marc Bolan) – 4:23
 Take Me Back (Ted Mulry) – 4:27
 The Last Time (Mick Jagger/Keith Richards) – 3:21
 Organ Grinder Blues (Clarence Williams) – 5:56
 Hippy Gumbo (Marc Bolan) – 4:41
 If It Ain't Hard, It Ain't Easy (Simon Napier-Bell) – 4:09
 Superman (Harry Vanda/George Young) – 2:29

Known Personnel
Alison McCallum: Vocals, Backing Vocals.
Phil Manning: Guitar.
Bobbi Marchini: Backing Vocals.

Production
Simon Napier-Bell: Producer.
John Hall: Cover Concept.
Craig Stiles: Artwork
Ian Potter: Photography

1972 debut albums
Alison MacCallum albums